The following is a timeline of the history of the city of Quito, Ecuador.

Prior to 20th century

 1487 - Incas in power.
 1527 - "Inka ruler Huayna Capac dies in Quito along with an estimated 200,000 of his subjects" (approximate date).
 1533 - Quito "burnt by Ruminahui."
 1534 - "Spanish soldiers, led by Sebastián de Belalcázar, defeat the Inka in Quito. They name the town Villa de San Francisco de Quito."
 1535
 Art school founded.
 Construction of Monastery of St. Francis begins (approximate date).
 1541 - Quito attains Spanish colonial city status.
 1545 - Catholic Diocese of Quito established.
 1548 - Quito becomes part of the Viceroyalty of Peru.
 1551 - Colegio de San Juan Evangelista established (approximate date).
 1563 - Spanish colonial Audiencia of Quito established.
 1592-1593 - Economic unrest.
 1613 - Church of the Society of Jesus building opens.
 1718 - Quito becomes part of Viceroyalty of New Granada.
 1735 - Earthquake.
 1765
 Quito Revolt.
 Church of the Society of Jesus building completed.
 1797 - Earthquake.
 1810 - Carondelet Palace built.
 1822 - May 24: Battle of Pichincha.
 1829 - Quito becomes capital of Ecuador.
 1859 - Earthquake.
 1865 - Guayaquil-Quito railway built (approximate date).
 1875 - August 6: Assassination of president Garcia Moreno.
 1880 -  opens.

20th century

 1906
 El Comercio newspaper begins publication.
 Chamber of Commerce established.
 Population: 50,840.
 1914 -  opens.
 1930 - LDU Quito football club formed.
 1932 - Estadio El Ejido (stadium) opens.
 1933 - Teatro Bolivar opens.
 1937 - Teatro Capitol built.
 1938 -  newspaper begins publication.
 1950 - Population: 209,932.
 1951 - Estadio Olímpico Atahualpa (stadium) opens.
 1955 - Deportivo Quito football club formed.
 1960 - Mariscal Sucre Airport begins operating.
 1972 - Population: 564,900 (approximate).
 1978 - Historic Center of Quito designated an UNESCO World Heritage Site.
 1982
 Hoy and La Hora  newspapers begin publication.
 Population: 866,472.
 1990
 May: Indigenous rights demonstration.
 Population: 1,100,847.
 1992
 September: Economic unrest.
  established.
 Jamil Mahuad becomes mayor.
 Coliseo General Rumiñahui (arena) built.
 1994 - Estadio Chillogallo (stadium) opens.
 1995 - January: Economic protest.
 1996 - March: Labor strike.
 1997
 February: Anti-Bucaram demonstration.
 September: Indigenous rights rally.
 Casa Blanca stadium opens.
 1999 - February 17: Assassination of politician Jaime Hurtado.
 2000
 January: Indigenous rights demonstration.
 Paco Moncayo becomes mayor.

21st century

 2001 - January: Indigenous rights demonstration.
 2006 - Quito TV begins broadcasting.
 2008 -  opens.
 2009 - Andrés Vallejo becomes mayor, succeeded by Augusto Barrera.
 2011 - Mashpi Rainforest Biodiversity Reserve established near city.
 2013 - New Mariscal Sucre International Airport opens.
 2014 - Mauricio Rodas becomes mayor.
 2015 - September: Forest fire.
 2016
 October: United Nations Conference on Housing and Sustainable Urban Development held in Quito.
 Population: 1,778,434.
 2019 - May: Ground broken for LDS Quito Ecuador Temple.

See also
 Quito history
 Urban evolution of colonial Quito

References

This article incorporates information from the Spanish Wikipedia.

Bibliography

 
  (Annotated list of titles published in Quito, arranged chronologically)

External links

 Map of Quito, 1986
 Items related to Quito, various dates (via Digital Public Library of America)

History of Quito
Quito
Ecuador history-related lists
Years in Ecuador
Quito